The 4th constituency of the Vosges is a French legislative constituency in the Vosges département.

Description

Vosges' 4th Constituency covers the western portion of the Department. It has the town of Neufchâteau at its north western corner and stretches as far as the village Bains-les-Bains close to Épinal in the centre of the Department.

Politically the seat has historically swung between the left, right and centre. The PS captured the seat with the slender margin of only 276 votes at the 2012 election. This result made it the only Socialist held seat in Vosges, before the seat was recaptured by Jean-Jacques Gaultier in 2017.

Historic Representation

Election results

2022

 
 

 
 
 
 

* Dissident PS member, not supported by the party or NUPES alliance.

2017

 
 
 
 
 
 
 
|-
| colspan="8" bgcolor="#E9E9E9"|
|-

2012

 
 
 
 
 
 
|-
| colspan="8" bgcolor="#E9E9E9"|
|-

2007

 
 
 
 
 
|-
| colspan="8" bgcolor="#E9E9E9"|
|-

2002

 
 
 
 
 
|-
| colspan="8" bgcolor="#E9E9E9"|
|-

1997

Sources
Official results of French elections from 2002: "Résultats électoraux officiels en France" (in French).

4